Carinamoeba is a subgenus of the genus Plasmodium - all of which are parasitic unicellular eukaryotes.

The subgenus was created in 1966 by Garnham. Species in this subgenus infect reptiles.

Diagnostic features 

The original criterion for inclusion in this genus was the presence of small schizonts giving rise to 8 or less merozoites. The criteria were subsequently revised by Telford in 1988.

Species in the subgenus Carinamoeba have the following characteristics:

Small schizonts giving rise to 8 or less merozoites

The gametocytes like the schizonts are small.

Species in this subgenus 
 Plasmodium attenuatum
 Plasmodium auffenbergi
 Plasmodium basilisci
 Plasmodium clelandi
 Plasmodium cordyli
 Plasmodium lygosomae
 Plasmodium mabuiae
 Plasmodium minasense
 Plasmodium rhadinurum
 Plasmodium scelopori
 Plasmodium volans

References 

Plasmodium subgenera